Pool A of the 2014 Women's Rugby World Cup is composed of 2010 World Cup runners-up England, Canada, Samoa and Spain.

Canada vs Spain

England vs Samoa

Canada vs Samoa

England vs Spain

Spain vs Samoa

England vs Canada

Notes

Pool A
2014–15 in English rugby union
2014 in Canadian rugby union
2014 in Samoan rugby union
rugby union
rugby union
rugby union